Parakionoceras is an extinct nautiloid that lived during the Silurian and Devonian in what is now Europe; included in the orthoceratoid family Kionoceratidae in the Treatise part K, 1964 but removed to the Arionoceratidae in Kröger 2008.

Parakionoceras has a long, faintly curved, exogastric shell with relatively long camerae and straight transverse sutures. The surface is lined with sharp-edged longitudinal ribs separated by broader concave inner areas. The siphuncle  is slightly eccentric; necks short and loxochoantitic, directed slightly inward; connecting rings slightly inflated. Cameral deposits well developed.

References
 Sweet, Walter C. 1964. Nautiloidea-Orthocerida. Treatise on Invertebrate Paleontology, Part K. Geological Soc of America, and Univ Kansas Press.
Parakionoceras -Paleobio db

Nautiloids
Silurian first appearances
Devonian extinctions